Hyperwar (portmanteau from the Ancient Greek preposition and prefix  "beyond" and the English "war") is a term coined by John R. Allen and Amir Husain which refers to algorithmic or "AI"-controlled warfare with little to no human decision making. Due to the autonomous nature of AI, it could rapidly increase the speed of warfare, especially if more than one side is relying on AI.  AI is not limited to new weapons such as drones or cyberwar, it can affect all forms of military planning.

See also 
 Artificial intelligence
 Cyberwarfare

Links 
 European Security & Technology, esut.de : Hyperwar - New challenges for army development
 November 5, 2020, Stefan Krempl:  Machine Warfare: From Drone Swarm to Hyperwar

References

Cyberwarfare
21st-century neologisms
2010s neologisms